This is a list of German physicists.

A 

 Ernst Abbe
 Max Abraham
 Gerhard Abstreiter
 Michael Adelbulner
 Martin Aeschlimann
 Georg von Arco
 Manfred von Ardenne
 Peter Armbruster
 Leo Arons
 Markus Aspelmeyer
 Felix Auerbach
 Bruno Augenstein

B 
 

 Ernst Emil Alexander Back
 Karl Baedeker
 Erich Bagge
 Marc Baldus
 Valentine Bargmann
 Heinrich Barkhausen
 Henry H. Barschall
 Heinz Barwich
 Ernst G. Bauer
 Karl Bechert
 Friedrich Beck
 Guido Beck
 Richard Becker
 Karl Heinz Beckurts
 Georg Bednorz
 August Beer
 Wilhelm von Beetz
 Martin Beneke
 Johann Benzenberg
 Berend Wilhelm Feddersen
 Arnold Berliner
 Arthur Berson
 Adolf Bestelmeyer
 Hans Bethe
 Sigfried Bethke
 Albert Betz
 Hans-Dieter Betz
 Paul Alfred Biefeld
 Ikaros Bigi
 Josef Bille
 Heinz Billing
 Gerd Binnig
 Marcus Birkenkrahe
 Paul Richard Heinrich Blasius
 Klaus Blaum
 Immanuel Bloch
 Detlef Blöcher
 Werner H. Bloss
 Eberhard Bodenschatz
 Bodo von Borries
 Martin Bojowald
 Friedrich Bopp
 Hans-Jürgen Borchers
 Max Born
 Manfred Börner
 Richard Börnstein
 Gerhard Borrmann
 Emil Bose
 Georg Matthias Bose
 Walther Bothe
 Heinrich Wilhelm Brandes
 Ernst Helmut Brandt
 Karl Ferdinand Braun
 Wernher von Braun
 Werner Braunbeck
 Carsten Bresch
 Hans Breuer
 Dirk Brockmann
 Eugen Brodhun
 Ernst Brüche
 Hermann Brück
 Alfred Bucherer
 Detlev Buchholz
 Bernd Büchner
 Alfons Bühl
 Heinrich Bürger
 Hans Busch
 Gerd Buschhorn

C 
 Philipp Carl
 Lorenz S. Cederbaum
 Ernst Chladni
 Elwin Bruno Christoffel
 Rudolf Clausius
 Emil Cohn
 Theodor des Coudres
 Christoph Cremer
 Erika Cremer
 Siegfried Czapski

D 

 Konrad Dannenberg
 Kurt H. Debus
 Max Delbrück
 Wolfgang Demtröder
 Guido Dessauer
 Kurt Diebner
 Gerhard Heinrich Dieke
 Walter Dieminger
 Hansjoerg Dittus
 Günther Dollinger
 Klara Döpel
 Robert Döpel
 Werner Döring
 Friedrich Ernst Dorn
 Walter Dornberger
 Heinrich Wilhelm Dove
 Jörg Dräger
 Olaf Dreyer
 Paul Drude
 Dirk Dubbers
 Hans-Peter Dürr

E 

 Gustav Eberhard
 Hermann Ebert
 Ernst R. G. Eckert
 Eduard Riecke
 Jürgen Ehlers
 Geoffrey G. Eichholz
 Albert Einstein
 Wolfgang Eisenmenger
 Jens Eisert
 Walter M. Elsasser
 Julius Elster
 Berthold-Georg Englert
 Georg Adolf Erman
 Paul Erman
 Gerhard Ertl
 Abraham Esau
 Tilman Esslinger
 Andreas von Ettingshausen
 Arnold Eucken
 Hans Heinrich Euler
 Paul Peter Ewald

F 

 Daniel Gabriel Fahrenheit
 Heino Falcke
 Hans Falkenhagen
 Lutz Feld
 Claudia Felser
 Klaus Fesser
 Wolfgang Fink
 Peter Finke
 Wolfgang Finkelnburg
 Erich Fischer
 Johannes Fischer
 Arnold Flammersfeld
 Rudolf Fleischmann
 Siegfried Flügge
 Albrecht Fölsing
 Theodor Förster
 Jens Frahm
 James Franck
 Moritz Ludwig Frankenheim
 Rudolph Franz
 Walter Franz
 Joseph von Fraunhofer
 Theodoric of Freiberg
 Benedict Friedlaender
 Harald Friedrich
 Harald Fritzsch
 Hellmut Fritzsche
 Klaus Fuchs
 Erwin Fues
 Peter Fulde

G 

 Wolfgang Gaede
 Otto Willi Gail
 Richard Gans
 Carl Friedrich Gauss
 Johann Samuel Traugott Gehler
 Ernst Gehrcke
 Hans Geiger
 Theo Geisel
 Hans Friedrich Geitel
 Wolfgang Gentner
 Paul Gerber
 Reimund Gerhard
 Walter Gerlach
 Christian Ludwig Gerling
 Christian Gerthsen
 Franz Josef Giessibl
 Ludwig Wilhelm Gilbert
 Herbert Gleiter
 Karl Glitscher
 Maria Goeppert-Mayer
 Adolf Goetzberger
 Gerhard W. Goetze
 Carl Wolfgang Benjamin Goldschmidt
 Eugen Goldstein
 Fritz Goos
 Walter Gordon
 Göttingen Eighteen
 Florian Goebel
 Wolfgang Götze
 Leo Graetz
 Robert Graham
 Daniel Gralath
 Hans Grassmann
 Hermann Grassmann
 Markus Greiner
 Walter Greiner
 Rudolf Grimm
 Claudius Gros
 Siegfried Grossmann
 Wilhelm Groth
 Helmut Gröttrup
 Peter Grünberg
 Eduard Grüneisen
 Otto von Guericke
 Peter Gumbsch
 Sibylle Günter

H 

 Rudolf Haag
 Heinz Haber
 Rolf Hagedorn
 Gotthilf Hagen
 Hermann Haken
 Wilhelm Hallwachs
 Thomas Hamacher
 Hilda Hänchen
 Wilhelm Hanle
 Theodor W. Hänsch
 Hauke Harder
 Johannes Franz Hartmann
 Werner Hartmann
 Christian August Hausen
 Isolde Hausser
 Otto Haxel
 Oskar Heil
 Burkhard Heim
 Jochen Heisenberg
 Werner Heisenberg
 Walter Heitler
 Wolfgang Helfrich
 Stefan Hell
 Hans Hellmann
 Hermann von Helmholtz
 Thomas Henning
 Klaus Hentschel
 Carl Hermann
 Grete Hermann
 Stephan Herminghaus
 Walter Herrmann
 Gustav Ludwig Hertz
 Heinrich Hertz
 Gerhard Herzberg
 Maximilian Herzberger
 Rolf-Dieter Heuer
 Burkard Hillebrands
 Arthur R. von Hippel
 Johann Wilhelm Hittorf
 Karl-Heinz Höcker
 Hanna von Hoerner
 Sebastian von Hoerner
 Ulrich Höfer
 Gerhard Hoffmann
 Sigurd Hofmann
 Hans Hollmann
 Christian Holm
 Wilhelm Holtz
 Michael Holzscheiter
 Helmut Hönl
 Ludwig Hopf
 Walter Hoppe
 Heinrich Hora
 Wilhelm Hort
 Sabine Hossenfelder
 Fritz Houtermans
 Alfred Hübler
 Erich Hückel
 Friedrich Hund
 Hans-Hermann Hupfeld
 Roland Hüttenrauch

I 
 Maximus von Imhof
 Caspar Isenkrahe
 Ernst Ising
 Patrick Ilg

J 
 
 Max Jakob
 J. Hans D. Jensen
 Peter Herbert Jensen
 Willibald Jentschke
 Sabina Jeschke
 Viktor K. Jirsa
 Johann Gottfried Teske
 Philipp von Jolly
 Claus Jönsson
 Georg Joos
 Pascual Jordan
 Johannes Juilfs

K 

 Wolfgang Kaiser
 Willi A. Kalender
 Salomon Kalischer
 Hartmut Kallmann
 Theodor Kaluza
 Karl Strehl
 Gustav Karsten
 Hermann Karsten
 Ralph Kaufmann
 Walter Kaufmann
 Heinrich Kayser
 Bernhard Keimer
 Christoph Helmut Keitel
 Nicholas Kemmer
 Julia Kempe
 Klaus Kern
 Johannes Kepler
 Boris Kerner
 Wolfgang Ketterle
 Karl-Otto Kiepenheuer
 Karl Johann Kiessling
 Erhard Kietz
 Gustav Kirchhoff
 Hans Volker Klapdor-Kleingrothaus
 Hagen Kleinert
 Ewald Georg von Kleist
 Otto Klemperer
 Gerhard Klimeck
 Klaus von Klitzing
 Heinz-Jürgen Kluge
 Hermann Knoblauch
 Stephan W. Koch
 Rudolph Koenig
 Friedrich Kohlrausch
 Rudolf Kohlrausch
 Hedwig Kohn
 Werner Kolhörster
 Heinrich Konen
 Arthur König
 Hans Kopfermann
 Arthur Korn
 Horst Korsching
 Walther Kossel
 Wolfgang Ludwig Krafft
 Gerhard Kraft
 Wolfgang Krätschmer
 Michael Kramer
 Christian Gottlieb Kratzenstein
 Adolf Kratzer
 Karl Kraus
 Dirk Kreimer
 Kurt Kremer
 Erich Kretschmann
 Herbert Kroemer
 August Krönig
 Bernd J. Kröger
 Ralph Kronig
 Eckhard Krotscheck
 Rainer Walter Kühne
 Rudolf Kühnhold
 Helmuth Kulenkampff
 August Kundt
 Adolph Theodor Kupffer
 Jochen Küpper
 Ferdinand Kurlbaum
 Jürgen Kurths
 Polykarp Kusch

L 

 Rudolf Ladenburg
 Johann von Lamont
 Rolf Landauer
 Alfred Landé
 Gottfried Landwehr
 Dieter Langbein
 Ludwig Lange
 Otto Laporte
 Gerda Laski
 Jakob Laub
 Max von Laue
 Harry Lehmann
 Otto Lehmann
 Gottfried Wilhelm Leibniz
 Philipp Lenard
 Emil Lenz
 Wilhelm Lenz
 Karl Leo
 Ulf Leonhardt
 Harald Lesch
 Jacob Leupold
 Hilde Levi
 Willy Ley
 Georg Christoph Lichtenberg
 Manfred Lindner
 Detlef Lohse
 Renate Loll
 Eugen von Lommel
 Gerhart Lüders
 Christian Ludwig
 Otto Lummer
 Dieter Lüst
 Reimar Lüst
 Josef Lutz

M 

 Erwin Madelung
 Heinrich Gustav Magnus
 Heinz Maier-Leibnitz
 Christoph von der Malsburg
 Jochen Mannhart
 Reinhold Mannkopff
 Herman March
 Henry Margenau
 Thomas Martinetz
 Herbert Mataré
 Gerhard Materlik
 Josef Mattauch
 Dieter Matthaei
 Hans Ferdinand Mayer
 Julius von Mayer
 Reinhard Mecke
 Reinhard Meinel
 Karl Meissner
 Walther Meissner
 Josef Meixner
 Franz Melde
 Angela Merkel
 Ulrich Mescheder
 Karl Mey
 Werner Meyer-Eppler
 Hajo Meyer
 Oskar Emil Meyer
 Theodor Meyer
 Rolf Michel
 Gustav Mie
 Jürgen Mlynek
 Dieter Möhl
 Richard Mollier
 Kurd von Mosengeil
 Rudolf Mössbauer
 Erwin Wilhelm Müller
 Justus Mühlenpfordt
 Harald J. W. Mueller-Kirsten
 Johann Heinrich Jakob Müller
 Klaus-Robert Müller
 Walther Müller
 Wilhelm Müller
 Georg Wilhelm Muncke
 Gottfried Münzenberg

N 

 Werner Nahm
 Elsa Neumann
 Franz Ernst Neumann
 Roger G. Newton
 Gereon Niedner-Schatteburg
 Alexander Nikuradse
 Johann Nikuradse
 Günter Nimtz
 Ida Noddack
 Emmy Noether
 Bengt Nölting
 Lothar Wolfgang Nordheim
 Johann Gottlieb Nörremberg

O 

 Anton Oberbeck
 Hermann Oberth
 Robert Ochsenfeld
 Reinhard Oehme
 Walter Oelert
 Arthur von Oettingen
 Hans von Ohain
 Georg Ohm
 Heinrich Wilhelm Matthias Olbers
 Johannes Orphal
 Wilhelm Orthmann
 Gottfried Osann
 Heinrich Ott

P 

 Friedrich Paschen
 Wolfgang Paul
 Rudolf Peierls
 Christoph Heinrich Pfaff
 Franz Pfeiffer
 Georg Pfotzer
 Bernhard Philberth
 Marcello Pirani
 Max Planck
 Jan Christoph Plefka
 Martin Bodo Plenio
 Julius Plücker
 Agnes Pockels
 Friedrich Carl Alwin Pockels
 Johann Christian Poggendorff
 Dieter Pohl
 Robert Pohl]
 Fritz-Albert Popp
 Heinz Pose
 Ludwig Prandtl
 Fritz Karl Preikschat
 Ernst Pringsheim Sr.
 Carl Pulfrich

Q 
 Hans-Joachim Queisser
 Georg Hermann Quincke

R 

 Jürgen P. Rabe
 Johann Rafelski
 Carl Ramsauer
 Karl Rawer
 Erich Regener
 Karl-Henning Rehren
 Werner E. Reichardt
 Fritz Reiche
 Hans Reissner
 Gerhard Rempe
 Jürgen Renn
 Mauritius Renninger
 Ernst Rexer
 Franz Richarz
 Georg Wilhelm Richmann
 Achim Richter
 Klaus Riedle
 Charlotte Riefenstahl
 Peter Theophil Riess
 Karl-Heinrich Riewe
 Johann Wilhelm Ritter
 Oskar Ritter
 Walter Rogowski
 Wilhelm Röntgen
 Harald Rose
 Ilse Rosenthal-Schneider
 Heinrich Rubens
 Andreas Rüdiger
 Paul Rudolph
 Carl David Tolmé Runge
 Iris Runge
 Wilhelm Runge
 Ernst Ruska

S 

 Erich Sackmann
 Corinna Salander
 Wolfgang Sandner
 Fritz Sauter
 Fritz Peter Schäfer
 Hendrik Schatz
 Karl Scheel
 Jens Scheer
 Frank Scheffold
 Valentin Scheidel
 Christoph Scheiner
 Hans Joachim Schellnhuber
 Harald Schering
 Otto Scherzer
 Josef Schintlmeister
 Dagmar Schipanski
 Wolfgang P. Schleich
 Helmut Schmidt
 Jürgen Schmitt
 Inge Schmitz-Feuerhake
 Eckehard Schöll
 Jan Hendrik Schön
 Gaspar Schott
 Walter H. Schottky
 Heinrich G. F. Schröder
 Manfred R. Schroeder
 Bert Schroer
 Engelbert Schücking
 Helmut W. Schulz
 Erich Schumann
 Victor Schumann
 Manfred Schüssler
 Karl Schwarzschild
 Martin Schwarzschild
 Gerhard Schwehm
 Achim Schwenk
 Johann Schweigger
 August Seebeck
 Thomas Johann Seebeck
 Rudolf Seeliger
 Jens Seipenbusch
 Walter Selke
 Ludwig August Seeber
 Henry Siedentopf
 Paul Eugen Sieg
 Francis Simon
 Hermann Theodor Simon
 Paul Söding
 Johann Georg von Soldner
 Arnold Sommerfeld
 Eckehard Specht
 Johann Sperling
 Hertha Sponer
 Johannes Stark
 Matthias Staudacher
 Max Steenbeck
 Carl August von Steinheil
 Hans Stephani
 Otto Stern
 Ernest J. Sternglass
 Georg Stetter
 Horst Stöcker
 Hans-Jürgen Stöckmann
 Horst Ludwig Störmer
 Herbert Arthur Stuart
 Hildegard Stücklen
 Ernst Stuhlinger
 Kurt Symanzik

T 
 Gustav Heinrich Johann Apollon Tammann
 Michel Ter-Pogossian
 Friedrich-Karl Thielemann
 Uwe Thumm
 Bruno Thüring
 Clemens Timpler
 Johann Daniel Titius
 August Toepler
 Maximilien Toepler
 Rudolf Tomaschek
 Peter E. Toschek
 Johann Georg Tralles
 Max Trautz
 Hans-Jürgen Treder

U 
 Albrecht Unsöld
 Knut Urban

V 

 Vitello
 Woldemar Voigt
 Dieter Vollhardt
 Helmut Volz

W 

 Heinrich Karsten Wagenfeld
 Ernst Wagner
 Gerhard Wagner
 Herbert Wagner
 Manfred Wagner
 Wilhelm Walcher
 Ludwig Waldmann
 Andreas Wallraff
 Emil Warburg
 Jürgen Warnatz
 Heinrich Friedrich Weber
 Wilhelm Eduard Weber
 Franz Wegner
 Stephanie Wehner
 Dieter Weichert
 Hans-Arwed Weidenmüller
 Richard M. Weiner
 Max Bernhard Weinstein
 Paul Weiss
 Walter Weizel
 Carl Friedrich von Weizsäcker
 Heinrich Welker
 Katrin Wendland
 Horst Wenninger
 Gregor Wentzel
 Werner Hofmann
 Julius Wess
 Wilhelm Westphal
 Christof Wetterich
 Eilhard Wiedemann
 Gustav Heinrich Wiedemann
 Max Wien
 Wilhelm Wien
 Otto Wiener
 Friedwardt Winterberg
 Karl Wirtz
 Christian Wissel
 Erich Peter Wohlfarth
 Ewald Wollny
 Hans Wolter
 Jörg Wrachtrup
 Theodor Wulf
 Adolf Wüllner
 Gunter Wyszecki

Z 
 Joseph Zähringer
 H. Dieter Zeh
 Alfred Zehe
 Elmar Zeitler
 Karl Eduard Zetzsche
 Gustav Zeuner
 Hans K. Ziegler
 Karl Zimmer
 Wolfhart Zimmermann
 Annette Zippelius
 Martin Zirnbauer
 Johann Karl Friedrich Zöllner
 Hartmut Zohm
 Georg Zundel

See also

List of physicists
List of German scientists
List of German inventions and discoveries
Science and technology in Germany

References 

German
 German physicists
Physicists